Ariana is the name of a medium-sized artificial lake in Knyaz Boris's Garden in Sofia, Bulgaria. It is "B"-shaped, 175 m long and 75 m wide, with a small island at its narrowest point. It is located at the northernmost corner of the park, in the city centre, between the Eagles' Bridge and the national stadium.

The lake was constructed in the late 19th century and has since been a focal point for leisurely walks by Sofianites. Water wheels and rowing boats have been a feature, and in winter it was frequently known to freeze over and for people to ice-skate on its surface.

In the mid-20th century, a casino was built on the island. In the early 1990s, the municipal government ceased caring for the lake, which dried up and remained empty and disused for nearly two decades. In 2007, the lake and its vicinity were renovated and once more began to be a place of leisure.

The lake shares its name with the brewery which was located a couple of hundred yards to the north until being demolished in 2004.

References

Ariana
Geography of Sofia
Landforms of Sofia City Province